Vendôme-Villiers-sur-Loir TGV is a high-speed railway station located in Vendôme and Villiers-sur-Loir, Loir-et-Cher, central France. The station was opened in 1990 and is located on the LGV Atlantique. The train services are operated by SNCF.

It is located 5 km northwest of Vendôme, closer to the small town Villiers-sur-Loir. The 178 km journey from Paris Montparnasse to Vendome TGV takes 42 minutes.

Train services
The station is served by the following services:

High speed services (TGV) Tours - Saint-Pierre-des-Corps - Paris
High speed services (TGV) Poitiers - Saint-Pierre-des-Corps - Paris

Bus services

 To Vendôme
 To Château-Renault
 To Mondoubleau

External links
 
 Votre réseau de transport en région Centre-Val de Loire, TER Centre-Val de Loire 
 Association of Vendome TGV to Paris passengers 

Railway stations in Loir-et-Cher
Railway stations in France opened in 1990